Il mistero dell'isola maledetta, internationally released as Giant of the Evil Island, is a 1965 Italian adventure film.

Cast
 Peter Lupus	as	Pedro Valverde (as Rock Stevens)
 Halina Zalewska	as	Dona Alma Morales
 Arturo Dominici	as	Don Alvarado
 Monique Renaud	as	Consuelo
 Nello Pazzafini	as	Malik (as Ted Carter)
 Dina De Santis	as 	Blanca
 Amedeo Trilli as 	Capt. José Rivera (as Mike Moore)
 Loris Gizzi	as	The Doctor
 Nando Angelini	as 	Ramon
 Nino Vingelli	as	Tortilla
 Attilio Dottesio	as	Lt. Esteban 
 Salvatore Borghese	as	Crow, pirate
 Ignazio Balsamo	as	Navarro

External links
 

1965 films
1960s Italian-language films
Pirate films
Italian adventure films
Films directed by Piero Pierotti
1960s Italian films